Meadowview station is a side platformed Sacramento RT light rail station in Sacramento, California, United States. The station was opened on September 26, 2003, and is operated by the Sacramento Regional Transit District. It is served by the Blue Line and was its southern terminus until 2015.  With a daily average of 5,400 riders, the Meadowview station is the second busiest in the RT light rail system behind 16th Street station.

Platforms and tracks

References 

Sacramento Regional Transit light rail stations
Railway stations in the United States opened in 2003